Tapson Kaseba (born 8 December 1992) is a Zambian footballer who plays as a forward for NAPSA Stars and the Zambia national football team.

Career

International

International Goals
Scores and results list Zambia's goal tally first.

References

External links

1992 births
Living people
Zambian footballers
Zambia international footballers
Kansanshi Dynamos F.C. players
Konkola Blades F.C. players
Green Eagles F.C. players
NAPSA Stars F.C. players
Association football forwards